This List of Anderson University (Indiana) alumni includes graduates, non-graduate former students and current students of Anderson Bible Training School, Anderson College and Theological Seminary, Anderson College, and/or Anderson University in Anderson, Indiana. 
Anderson University is a private Christian liberal arts university affiliated with the Church of God (Anderson). Established in 1917 as the Anderson Bible Training School, the school changed its name to Anderson College and Theological Seminary, then Anderson College, and finally, Anderson University.

Academia

{{Alum|name=Kevin T. Pitts|year=1988|nota=Chief research officer at Fermilab National Accelerator Laboratory|ref=

Business and industry

Government, law, and public policy

Medicine

Entertainment

Professional athletics

Music

Film and theatre

Television and radio

Video games

References

Anderson University alumni